EGF-containing fibulin-like extracellular matrix protein 1 is a protein that in humans is encoded by the EFEMP1 gene.

Gene 

This gene encodes a member of the fibulin family of extracellular matrix glycoproteins. Like all members of this family, the encoded protein contains tandemly repeated epidermal growth factor-like repeats followed by a C-terminus fibulin-type domain. This gene is upregulated in malignant gliomas and may play a role in the aggressive nature of these tumors. Mutations in this gene are associated with Doyne honeycomb retinal dystrophy and with  predisposition to hernias. Alternatively spliced transcript variants that encode the same protein have been described.[provided by RefSeq, Nov 2009]. This gene spans approximately 18 kb of genomic DNA and consists of 12 exons. Alternative splice patterns in the 5' UTR result in three transcript variants encoding the same extracellular matrix protein.

Clinical significance 

Mutations in this gene are associated with Doyne honeycomb retinal dystrophy and with predisposition to hernias.

EFEMP1/Fibulin-3 has recently been reported as a potential biomarker to facilitate the identification of patients with pleural mesothelioma.

Interactions
EFEMP1 has been shown to interact with ARAF.

References

Further reading